The Burrowes Film Group was a short lived Australian production company established in the wake of the success of The Man from Snowy River (1982) and Anzacs (1985). It was named after Geoff Burrowes. Other key personnel included John Dixon and George T. Miller.

In late 1985 they announced a $53 million package of several films over the next two years, including Cool Change, Free Enterprise (which became Running from the Guns), The Man from Snowy River 2, Clancy of the Overflow, Backstage, Future Tense (which became Dogs in Space) and Ground Zero. Of these only Clancy was not made. For Dogs in Space and Ground Zero the company worked mainly to secure finance leaving creative decisions to others, in exchange for a fee.

However the majority of the movies were not financially successful and the company was soon wound up. The accounting practices of the group earned them a great deal of notoriety within the industry.

Select Credits
 Cool Change (1985)
 Dogs in Space (1986)
 Ground Zero (1987)
 Running from the Guns (1987) 
 Backstage (1988)
 The Man from Snowy River II (1988)
 Minnamurra (1989)

Unmade films
 Clancy of the Overflow – a proposed $12 million film based on the poem which was to be shot in 1987

References

External links
 Burrowes Film Group at Screen Australia
 Burrowes Film Group at IMDb
 Burrowes Film Group at AustLit (subscription required)

Film production companies of Australia